Platymetopus is a genus of beetles in the family Carabidae, containing the following species:

 Platymetopus brevilabris Laferte-Senectere, 1853 
 Platymetopus colpophilus Alluaud, 1918 
 Platymetopus congestulus Basilewsky, 1948 
 Platymetopus crenulatus Chaudoir, 1878 
 Platymetopus cribricollis Facchini, 2004 
 Platymetopus curtulus (Peringuey, 1908) 
 Platymetopus cyaneus Facchini, 2004 
 Platymetopus diversepunctatus Facchini, 2004 
 Platymetopus figuratus Boheman, 1848 
 Platymetopus flavilabris (Fabricius, 1798) 
 Platymetopus guineensis Dejean, 1831 
 Platymetopus indicus Jedlicka, 1969 
 Platymetopus interpunctatus Dejean, 1829 
 Platymetopus keiseri Louwerens, 1956 
 Platymetopus laevigatus Kuntzen, 1919  
 Platymetopus laticeps Dejean, 1829 
 Platymetopus lepidus Dejean, 1829 
 Platymetopus ludificus (H.Kolbe, 1883) 
 Platymetopus majusculus Lorenz, 1998 
 Platymetopus obscuripes Chaudoir, 1878 
 Platymetopus pictus Andrewes, 1923 
 Platymetopus platythorax Basilewsky, 1948 
 Platymetopus quadrimaculatus Dejean, 1829 
 Platymetopus quadrinotatus Burgeon, 1936 
 Platymetopus rectangularis Burgeon, 1936 
 Platymetopus rugosus (Nietner, 1857) 
 Platymetopus sakalava Jeannel, 1948 
 Platymetopus schoenherri Dejean, 1831 
 Platymetopus seriatus Chaudoir, 1878 
 Platymetopus straeleni Basilewsky, 1947 
 Platymetopus subrugosus Schauberger, 1938 
 Platymetopus sudanicus Basilewsky, 1967 
 Platymetopus tessellatus Dejean, 1829 
 Platymetopus tibialis (H.Kolbe, 1883) 
 Platymetopus tritus Bates, 1889 
 Platymetopus vestitus Dejean, 1829 
 Platymetopus xanthographus (Alluaud, 1916)

References

Harpalinae